José Antonio Chamot (born 17 May 1969) is a retired Argentine footballer and current manager who played as a full-back, mainly on the left flank but occasionally also on the right and, very rarely, as a centre-back.

Club career 
Born in Concepción del Uruguay, Chamot began his career with Rosario Central in his native Argentina, and then moved to Italy, where he played for Pisa (1991–93), Foggia (1993–94) and Lazio (1994–98). His spell at Lazio cemented him as one of the top full-backs in the Serie A; during his last season with the Roman club, he won the 1997–98 Coppa Italia. While playing for Lazio, he deliberately shook referee Pierluigi Collina's hand too firmly post match, and earned a one-game ban for dissent.

Chamot then moved to Spain, where he spent one and a half seasons with Atlético Madrid, before returning to Italy (in the January 2000 transfer window) in order to join giants A.C. Milan, for whom he played until 2003, winning the 2002–03 UEFA Champions League and the 2002–03 Coppa Italia. He left Milan during the summer of 2003 (by that time he had lost his place in the starting eleven) and signed for Spanish side Leganés. After an injury-plagued season there, Chamot returned to Argentina to spend the final years of his career (2004–06) with Rosario Central, the club where he had started as a professional footballer; again, however, he was troubled by injuries, and announced his retirement at the end of 2006.

International career 
Chamot earned 43 caps for Argentina over the course of 9 years (1993–2002), and played in three FIFA World Cups (1994, 1998 and 2002). He was Argentina's starting left-back during both the 1994 and 1998 World Cups, and also played one match in 2002 against Sweden, where he was employed as right-back.

He was also part of the Argentina Argentina under-23 squad that won the silver medal at the 1996 Summer Olympics in Atlanta, Georgia, as one of the three overage players (older than 23) allowed for every squad.

Coaching career
From July 2009 to March 2010, Chamot was the assistant manager of Rosario Central. In June 2011, be was appointed as assistant manager under Matías Almeyda at River Plate. The left in November 2012 after 18 months.

At the end of December 2015, he was appointed as coordinator for the youth sector of Rosario Central. One year later it was reported, that Chamot couldn't agree with the club on a new contract, and decided to leave his position. He returned to the club on 19 December 2017, where he was appointed as manager for the reserve team of Rosario. He held the position until 7 March 2019, where he was appointed as manager of Club Libertad. Chamot was released on 12 December 2019.

Honours 

S.S. Lazio
 Coppa Italia: 1997–98

A.C. Milan
 UEFA Champions League: 2002–03
 Coppa Italia: 2002–03

References

External links 
 
 Chamot's matches & goals 

Living people
1969 births
Sportspeople from Entre Ríos Province
Association football fullbacks
Argentine footballers
Argentina international footballers
Argentine people of French descent
Rosario Central footballers
Pisa S.C. players
Calcio Foggia 1920 players
S.S. Lazio players
A.C. Milan players
Atlético Madrid footballers
CD Leganés players
Serie A players
Serie B players
La Liga players
1994 FIFA World Cup players
1998 FIFA World Cup players
2002 FIFA World Cup players
1995 King Fahd Cup players
1995 Copa América players
Olympic silver medalists for Argentina
Olympic footballers of Argentina
Footballers at the 1996 Summer Olympics
Expatriate footballers in Italy
Argentine expatriate footballers
Argentine Primera División players
Expatriate footballers in Spain
Argentine expatriate sportspeople in Italy
Argentine expatriate sportspeople in Spain
Olympic medalists in football
Medalists at the 1996 Summer Olympics